Lille Métropole Basket Clubs, often referred to as LMBC, is a French professional basketball club based in Lille. The club currently plays in the LNB Pro B, the second division of basketball in France.

Players

Current roster

Season by season

Notable players

 Jean-Victor Traore
 Jason Siggers
 Ivan Almeida

External links
Official website (in French)

Basketball teams in France
Basketball teams established in 1994